James "Jack" Crawford (born 3 May 1997) is a Canadian World Cup alpine ski racer. He specializes in super-G, and also competes in giant slalom, downhill, and combined.

Crawford made his World Cup debut in January 2016 in a super-G at Kitzbühel, Austria. He competed in the 2018 Winter Olympics, and the World Championships in 2019 and 2021, where he was fourth in the combined event.

At the 2023 World Championships in Courchevel, Crawford won his first gold medal in Super-G.

In January 2022, Crawford was named to Canada's Olympic team; he was fourth in the downhill, sixth in the super-G, and won the bronze medal in the combined.

Crawford's older sister Candace is also an alpine racer; their aunt is Judy Crawford, who finished fourth in the slalom at the 1972 Winter Olympics at Sapporo.

World Cup results

Season standings

Race podiums
 0 wins
 4 podiums (3 DH, 1 SG); 14 top tens (7 DH, 7 SG)

World Championship results

Olympic results

References

External links
 
 
 Jack Crawford at Alpine Canada

1997 births
Living people
Alpine skiers at the 2018 Winter Olympics
Alpine skiers at the 2022 Winter Olympics
Canadian male alpine skiers
Olympic alpine skiers of Canada
Place of birth missing (living people)
Medalists at the 2022 Winter Olympics
Olympic bronze medalists for Canada
Olympic medalists in alpine skiing